838 Seraphina (prov. designation:  or ) is a dark and large background asteroid, approximately  in diameter, located in the outer regions of the asteroid belt. It was discovered by German astronomer Max Wolf at the Heidelberg-Königstuhl State Observatory on 24 September 1916. The primitive P-type asteroid has a rotation period of 15.7 hours and is rather spherical in shape. Any reference to the origin of the asteroid's name is unknown.

Orbit and classification 

Seraphina is a non-family asteroid of the main belt's background population when applying the hierarchical clustering method to its proper orbital elements. It orbits the Sun in the outer asteroid belt at a distance of 2.5–3.3 AU once every 4 years and 11 months (1,802 days; semi-major axis of 2.9 AU). Its orbit has an eccentricity of 0.13 and an inclination of 10° with respect to the ecliptic. The body's observation arc begins with its official discovery observation at Heidelberg Observatory on 24 September 1916.

Naming 

Any reference of this minor planet name to a person or occurrence is unknown.

Unknown meaning 

Among the many thousands of named minor planets, Seraphina is one of 120 asteroids for which no official naming citation has been published.

Physical characteristics 

In the Tholen classification, Seraphina is a very dark, primitive P-type asteroid, that falls into the wider group of the carbonaceous C-Complex. In both the Tholen- and SMASS-like taxonomy of the Small Solar System Objects Spectroscopic Survey (S3OS2), it is an X-type asteroid. P-type asteroids are common in the outer asteroid belt and among the Jupiter trojans.

Rotation period 

In November 2005, a rotational lightcurve of Seraphina was obtained from photometric observations by French amateur astronomer Raymond Poncy. Lightcurve analysis gave a rotation period of  hours with a low brightness variation of  magnitude, indicative of a rather spherical shape. Other observations include a period of  hours with an amplitude of  magnitude by Richard Binzel from June 1984, and a period of  hours with an amplitude of  magnitude by the Spanish group of asteroid observers, OBAS, in November 2015.

In 2018, Czech astronomers Josef Ďurech and Josef Hanuš published a modeled lightcurve using photometric data from the Gaia spacecraft's second data release. It showed a sidereal period of  hours, and gave two spin axes at (18.0°, 4.0°) and (192.0°, 32.0°) in ecliptic coordinates (λ, β).

Diameter and albedo 

The Collaborative Asteroid Lightcurve Link derives an albedo of 0.0427 and a diameter of 59.75 kilometers based on an absolute magnitude of 10.16.

These timed observations are taken when the asteroid passes in front of a distant star. However, these two observations have received a poor quality rating.

References

External links 
 Lightcurve Database Query (LCDB), at www.minorplanet.info
 Dictionary of Minor Planet Names, Google books
 Asteroids and comets rotation curves, CdR – Geneva Observatory, Raoul Behrend
 Discovery Circumstances: Numbered Minor Planets (1)-(5000) – Minor Planet Center
 
 

000838
Discoveries by Max Wolf
Named minor planets
000838
19160924